Shirley Galloway (born August 20, 1934) is an American politician who served in the Washington House of Representatives from the 49th district from 1979 to 1985 and in the Washington State Senate from the 17th district from 1996 to 1997.

References

1934 births
Living people
Democratic Party members of the Washington House of Representatives
Democratic Party Washington (state) state senators
Women state legislators in Washington (state)